Scott Scheuermann (born 23 April 1954) is a Canadian modern pentathlete. He competed at the 1972 Summer Olympics.

References

External links
 

1954 births
Living people
Canadian male modern pentathletes
Olympic modern pentathletes of Canada
Modern pentathletes at the 1972 Summer Olympics
People from Morristown, New Jersey
Sportspeople from Morris County, New Jersey